Class 36 may refer to:

 DRG Class 36, a class of German passenger locomotive with a 4-4-0 wheel arrangement operated by the Deutsche Reichsbahn comprising the:
 Class 36.0-4: Prussian P 4.2
 Class 36.4-5: PKP Class Od 2
 Class 36.6: Mecklenburg P 4.2
 Class 36.7-8: Bavarian B XI
 Class 36 861: Bavarian P 2/4
 Class 36.9-10: Saxon VIII V2
 Class 36.1201-1219: Oldenburg P 4.1, 
 Class 36.1251-1258: Oldenburg P 4.2
 Class 36.70: Prussian P 4.1
 Class 36.70II: EWA IIa